Deborah Elizabeth Copaken (born 1966) is an American author and photojournalist.

Early life and education
Copaken was born in Boston, Massachusetts, the daughter of Marjorie Ann (née Schwartz) and Richard Daniel Copaken. Her father was a White House Fellow and lawyer. She grew up in Maryland, first in Adelphi, and then from 1970 in Potomac. She has three siblings. She graduated from Harvard University in 1988.

Career
Prior to beginning a writing career, Copaken was a war photographer from 1988 to 1992, and a television producer at ABC and NBC from 1992 to 1998. For the former, she was based in Paris and Moscow, while shooting assignments on conflicts in Zimbabwe, Afghanistan, Romania, Pakistan, Israel, Soviet Union and other places. She first worked as a producer at Day One in ABC News, where she received an Emmy, then in Dateline NBC.

In 2001, she published a memoir of her experiences in war photojournalism, Shutterbabe. Her first novel Between Here and April was published in 2008 and won the November Elle Reader's Prize. In 2009, she released a book of comic essays, Hell is Other Parents, some of which appeared in the New Yorker and The New York Times.

Her second novel, The Red Book (Hyperion/Voice, 2012), was a New York Times bestseller. The book was long-listed for the 2013 Women's Prize for Fiction. In 2016 and 2017, she released two nonfiction books, The ABCs of Adulthood and The ABCs of Parenthood, in collaboration with illustrator Randy Polumbo.

She has written several articles for The New Yorker, The New York Times, Observer, The Atlantic, Business Insider, The Nation and others.

She has performed and curated live storytelling for The Moth, Afterbirth, the Six Word Memoir series, Women of Letters, and Words and Music. She has also ventured into screenwriting, and it was reported that she was adapting Shutterbabe as a TV series for NBC in 2014. She was a consultant on Darren Star's  Younger and is currently a staff writer on his new show Emily in Paris. She has been interviewed by several news program including The Today Show and Good Morning America.

In 2013, Copaken wrote an essay for The Nation detailing sexism she has encountered and observed in her career. In November 2017 in Oprah.com, she published a 3,500-word account of her supracervical hysterectomy, adenomyosis and trachelectomy, and her subsequent recovery in Nepal. In July 2018 in The Atlantic, in an essay pertaining to Roe V. Wade, she wrote that three of her five pregnancies were unplanned and that she had undergone two abortions.

In 2019, her New York Times Modern Love essay, "When Cupid is a Prying Journalist," was adapted into Episode 2 of Amazon's Modern Love series, with Catherine Keener playing Copaken. She also collaborated with Tommy Siegel of Jukebox the Ghost. She is represented by literary agent Lisa Leshne.

Personal life
She lived in Paris and Moscow before moving to New York City in 1992. She became engaged to and married Paul Kogan in 1993. They have three children: son Jacob (born 1995); daughter Sasha (born 1997); and son Leo (born 2006). In 2018, she and Kogan divorced; as she wrote in The Atlantic, they did so without legal assistance, at a cost of $626.50.

Copaken wrote about being assaulted in her early twenties. She wrote that she endured a number of random assaults and muggings, "[S]ome were quite scary". In March 2018 in The Atlantic, she wrote about The New York Observer editor Ken Kurson sexually harassing her.

Copaken has also recounted that she was date raped on the night before her graduation. The next day she reported the incident to the university's health service, but was advised not to report her rape to police by her psychologist as the lengthy legal process might have affected her plans after graduation. She wrote in The Atlantic, 30 years after the incident, that she had recently written to her assailant and that the assailant had called and apologized to her.

Works
 Shutterbabe: Adventures in Love and War (2001)  – memoir
 Between Here and April (2008)  – novel
 Hell Is Other Parents: And Other Tales of Maternal Combustion (2009)  – essay
 The Red Book (2012)  – novel
 The ABCs of Adulthood: An Alphabet of Life Lessons (2016)  – nonfiction, illustrations by Copaken and Randy Polumbo
 The ABCs of Parenthood: An Alphabet of Parenting Advice (2017)  – nonfiction, illustration by Copaken and Polumbo
Ladyparts (2021)  – memoir

References

External links

1966 births
Living people
American photojournalists
21st-century American memoirists
21st-century American novelists
Harvard University alumni
American women photographers
War photographers
Jewish women writers
American women memoirists
American women essayists
American women novelists
21st-century American women writers
People from Adelphi, Maryland
People from Potomac, Maryland
21st-century American essayists
Women photojournalists